Vanga was an ancient kingdom and geopolitical division within the Ganges delta in the Indian subcontinent. The kingdom is one of the namesakes of the Bengal region. It was located in southern Bengal, with the core region including present-day southern West Bengal (India) and southwestern Bangladesh. Vanga features prominently in the epics and tales of ancient India as well as in the history of Sri Lanka.

Vanga was probably the center of the Gangaridai Empire mentioned by numerous Greco-Roman writers. The exact capital of ancient Vanga kingdom could not be identified. After the rule of Gupta empire, ancient Bengal was divided into two independent states. They were the Gauda Kingdom and Vanga kingdom and archaeologists think that Kotalipara in present-day Bangladesh was the capital of the independent Vanga kingdom.

Indian and Greco-Roman writers referred to the region's war elephants. In Indian history, Vanga is notable for its strong navy. There are numerous references to Vanga in the Hindu epic Mahabharata, which is one of the two major Sanskrit epics of India. The other epic, the Ramayana, mentions the kingdom as an ally of Ayodhya.

History
The Vanga kingdom emerged in the lower Ganges delta during the Northern Black Polished Ware Period. It controlled many of the islands of the delta with its naval fleet and embarked on overseas exploration. Ancient Indian records refer to Vanga as a hub of sailors. In the 5th century BCE, the Vanga king Sinhabahu's son prince Vijaya sailed across the Bay of Bengal and established a kingdom in what is now Sri Lanka. The religious traditions of the kingdom included Jainism, Buddhism and Hinduism.

Vanga is recorded as an administrative unit in the Arthashastra written by Kautilya. It is described as a notable naval power by Kalidasa. There are also records of subdivisions within Vanga, including an area called "Upa Vanga" (minor Vanga) which corresponds to Jessore and forested areas corresponding to the Sundarbans.

The rulers of the Vanga kingdom remain mostly unknown. After the 2nd century BCE, the territory became part of successive Indian empires, including Mauryans, Guptas, Shashanka's reign, Khadgas, Palas, Chandras, Senas and Devas. The term Vangala was often used to refer to the territory. For example, an inscription of the South Indian Chola dynasty referred to the region as Vangaladesha during a war with the Chandra dynasty.  After the Muslim conquest of Bengal , the region was referred to as Bangalah, which may have evolved from Vangala. The names are the precursors of the modern terms Banga and Bangla.

Geography
The core region of Vanga lay between the Padma-Meghna river system in the east and the Bhagirathi-Hooghly river system in the west. In the east, it encompassed the modern Bangladeshi Khulna Division excluding pre-1947 Jessore District i.e. Upa Vanga  which is in Paschim (West) Vanga  and Barisal Division, as well as the southwestern part of Dhaka Division. In the west, it included Presidency Division of West Bengal and may have extended to Burdwan Division and Medinipur division. Its neighbors included Samatata in the east; Pundravardhana in the north; and Magadha, Anga, Suhma and Radha in the west.

The Vanga kingdom encompassed the many islands of the Ganges delta and the Sundarbans mangrove forest.

Archaeology
Chandraketugarh and Wari-Bateshwar ruins are the major archaeological site of the kingdom.

References in the Mahabharata 

At (6:9), Anga, Vanga, and Kalinga were mentioned as close kingdoms in Bharata Varsha (Ancient India). All regions of sacred waters and all other holy palaces there were in Vanga and Kalinga, Arjuna visited all of them, during his pilgrimage lasting for 12 years throughout ancient India.

The founders of Angas, Vangas, Kalingas, Pundras and Suhmas shared a common ancestry. They were all adopted sons of a king named Vali (Bali), born by a sage named Gautama Dirghatamas, who lived in Magadha close to the city of Girivraja.
Other texts say that, because king Bali had no descendants, this deputed rishi Dirghatamaas to give birth of the children and thus five sons were born from the womb of the wife of Bali.

Other expeditions to Vanga
The Kashmiras, the Daradas, the Kuntis, the Kshudrakas, the Malavas, the Angas, the Vangas, the Kalingas, the Videhas, the Tamraliptakas, the Rakshovahas, the Vitahotras, the Trigartas, the Martikavatas were all vanquished by Bhargava Rama (7:68).

Karna captured the Angas, and the Vangas, and the Kalingas, and the Mandikas, and the Magadhas. the Karkakhandas; and also included with them the Avasiras, Yodhyas, and the Ahikshatras (3:252).

The Angas, the Vangas, the Kalingas, the Magadhas, the Kasis, the Kosalas, the Vatsyas, the Gargyas, the Karushas and the Paundras were mentioned to be vanquished by Vasudeva Krishna (7:11).

Arjuna defeated the countries of the Vangas, the Pundras, and the Kosalas (14:82) in his military campaign after Kurukshetra War.

Tributes to Yudhishthira
The kings of Anga, Vanga and Pundra were mentioned as attending the court of Yudhishthira at (2:4). The Vangas, Angas, Paundras, Odras, Cholas, Dravidas and Andhrakas were mentioned to be giving tribute to Yudhishthira (3:51). The Angas, the Vangas, the Punras, the Sanavatyas, and the Gayas—these good and well-born Kshatriyas distributed into regular clans and trained to the use of arms, brought tribute unto king Yudhishthira by hundreds and thousands. The Vangas, the Kalingas, the Magadhas, the Tamraliptas, the Supundrakas, the Dauvalikas, the Sagarakas, the Patrornas, the Saisavas, and innumerable Karnapravaranas, were found waiting at the gate (2:51).

Vangas in Kurukshetra War
Vanga army was skilled in handling war elephants. They sided with the Kauravas.

Vangas sided with Duryodhana in the Kurukshetra War (8:17) along with the Kalingas. They are mentioned as part of the Kaurava army at (7:158). Many foremost of combatants skilled in elephant-fight, belonging to the Easterners, the Southerners, the Angas, the Vangas, the Pundras, the Magadhas, the Tamraliptakas, the Mekalas, the Koshalas, the Madras, the Dasharnas, the Nishadas united with the Kalingas (8:22). Satyaki, pierced the vitals of the elephant belonging to the king of the Vangas (8:22).

Bhagadatta was mentioned as the ruler of the Pragjyotisha kingdom that took part in the Kurukshetra War.

Behind Duryodhana proceeded the ruler of the Vangas, with ten thousand elephants, huge as hills, and each with juice trickling down (6:92). The ruler of the Vangas (Bhagadatta) mounting upon an elephant huge as a hill, drove towards the Rakshasa, Ghatotkacha. On the field of battle, with the mighty elephant of great speed, Bhagadatta placed himself in the very front of Duryodhana's car. With that elephant he completely shrouded the car of thy son. Beholding then the way (to Duryodhana's car) thus covered by the intelligent king of the Vangas, the eyes of Ghatotkacha became red in anger. He ruled that huge dart, before upraised, at that elephant. Struck with that dart hurled from the arms of Ghatotkacha, that elephant, covered with blood and in great agony, fell down and died. The mighty king of the Vangas, however, quickly jumping down from that elephant, alighted on the ground (6:93).

Rulers of Vanga
At (2:29) two rulers Samudrasena and Chadrasena were mentioned. It is not clear if they were rulers of Vanga kingdom. Karna is mentioned as the ruler of Anga and Vanga at (2:43). Paundraka Vasudeva, an ally of Jarasandha and enemy of Vasudeva Krishna is mentioned as king of Vanga, Pundra and the Kiratas at (2:14). Bhagadatta is mentioned as the ruler of Vanga at (8:22).

Probably all these rulers had a stake in the territory of Vanga. All of them were mentioned as ruling the neighbouring kingdoms of Vanga, in other passages in Mahabharata. Bhagadatta was the ruler of Pragjyotisha Kingdom to the north of Vanga. Paundraka Vasudeva ruled Pundra Kingdom to the east of Vanga and Karna ruled Anga Kingdom to the west of Vanga.

Other references
Kings of Kalinga and Vanga were mentioned as attending the self choice ceremony of the Panchala princess, along with Vasudeva the king of Pundra.

See also
 Kingdoms of Ancient India

References

 Mahabharata of Krishna Dwaipayana Vyasa, translated to English by Kisari Mohan Ganguli

External links

Kingdoms in the Mahabharata
Indo-Aryan peoples
Ancient Bengal